Hughes ( in Koyukon) is a city in Yukon-Koyukuk Census Area, Alaska, United States. The population was 85 at the 2020 census, up from 77 in 2010.

Geography

Demographics

Hughes first appeared on the 1920 U.S. Census as an unincorporated village. It did not appear on the 1930 census, but returned in 1940. It formally incorporated in 1973.

The majority of the town's population are ethnic Koyukon, Alaskan Athabaskans. Some of the town's population, as of the 1970s, spoke the Central Dialect of the Koyukon language.

As of the census of 2020, there were 85 people, 36 households, and 11 families residing in the city. There were 47 housing units at an average density of 15.7 per square mile (6/km2). The racial makeup of the city was 5.88% White, 89.41% Native American, and 4.7% from two or more races. 1.18% of the population were Hispanic or Latino of any race.

There were 36 households, out of which 30.6% had children under the age of 18 living with them, 38.9% were married couples living together, 11.1% had a female householder with no husband present, 33.3% had a male householder with no wife present, and 16.7% were non-families. 44.4% of all households were made up of individuals. The average household size was 2.66 and the average family size was 2.26.

In the city, the age distribution of the population was 12.5% under the age of 18, 70.8% from 18 to 64, and 16.7% who were 65 years of age or older. The median age was 50.3 years.

The median income for a household in the city was $28,750, and the median income for a family was $37,917. The per capita income for the city was $12,126. There was 30.6% of the population living below the poverty line, including 22.2% of under eighteens and 41.7% of those over 64.

Education
The Yukon–Koyukuk School District operates the Johnny Oldman School in Hughes.

References

Cities in Alaska
Cities in Yukon–Koyukuk Census Area, Alaska